The Million Programme was a large public housing program implemented in Sweden between 1965 and 1974 by the governing Swedish Social Democratic Party to ensure the availability of affordable, high quality housing to all Swedish citizens. The program sought to construct one million new housing dwellings over a ten-year period, which it accomplished. As part of its intention to modernize Swedish housing, it also demolished many older buildings that national and local governments considered obsolescent, unhealthy or derelict.

At the time, the intention to build one million new homes in a nation with a population of eight million made the Million Programme the most ambitious building programme in the world. In contrast to the social housing proposals of many other developed countries, which is targeted at those with low incomes, the Million Programme was a universal program intended to provide housing to Swedish people at a variety of income levels.

Background 
The housing shortage in Sweden before the start of the programme was a major political and social issue in Sweden. Between 1860 and 1960, Sweden had transformed from an agrarian nation to a highly industrialized nation, which led to a large urbanization trend. The population in the countryside moved in large numbers to towns and cities after 1945. This urbanization following World War II was also encouraged by the authorities and governing establishment. After the war, as Swedish industry was unharmed, cities needed workers to produce the amount of goods demanded by the rest of war-destroyed Europe. The major cities of Sweden had in many cases had their last building boom in the late-19th century and were, by 1950, much too small to accommodate the rural population then flooding into the cities.

The increasing standard of living led to demands to dramatically decrease the population density and to abolish the old  (Dirt Sweden). This was made possible because of the outstanding growth Sweden had during the record years (rekordåren) in the 1950s and 1960s which led to a flood of income to the national treasury. This money was used to implement social reforms. The social democratic government implemented reforms to ensure the availability of land, such as new land seizure rules for local authorities, as long as the landowner was planning to sell it to a private buyer. Another new law said that a municipality could build homes outside its border ("Lex Bollmora"), because rural municipalities near Stockholm could not afford to build so much.

Program 
Over the lifespan of the program, 1,006,000 new dwellings were built. For the houses designed for the lowest-income group, the government would bear 66% of the initial costs and this would be repaid by the customers and residents in a 30-year period. For other categories such as students, blue collar workers, and immigrants, the government provided subsidies and incentives to building companies in order to start construction. The net result was an increase in Sweden’s housing stock of 650,000 new apartments and houses, financed through property taxes, with a general rise in housing quality.

Design 
The new Million Programme residential areas were greatly inspired by early suburban neighbourhoods such as Vällingby and Årsta. One of the main aims behind the planning of these residential areas was to create "good democratic citizens". The means of achieving this were to build at high quality with a good range of services including schools, nurseries, churches, public spaces, libraries, and meeting places for different groups of households. A principal aim was to mix and integrate different groups of households through the spatial mixing of tenures. Most of the apartments were of the "standard three room apartment" (two bedroom apartment) type (Swedish: normaltrea) of 75 m² (810 sq ft), planned for a model family of two adults and two children. The second type of apartments were the "student blocks" or "student suburbs" that were planned and built in the cities having large universities, like Stockholm, Lund, Uppsala, Linköping and Umeå. Almost 150,000 new "student apartments" were built in specially designated "student suburbs" in order to meet the needs of the rapidly increasing university student population. These student apartments were usually 1-bedroom 1-bathroom and common kitchen type dorms that were clustered together in a large suburb or neighbourhood. The ownership of the apartments were leased out to "housing companies" like Heimstaden AB who rented it out at below market rates, the rents being subsidized by the government.

The Million Programme is sometimes equated with the construction of concentrated tower blocks. However, these areas constituted about one third of the programme's apartments. Areas with lower apartment blocks and areas with one-family houses made up about the remaining two thirds of the number of total units.

Criticism 
Many of Sweden's so-called vulnerable areas were constructed during the Million Programme. Therefore, it is common to accuse the reform of having created segregation. The program has also been criticized for producing architecturally dull buildings. The choice of concrete as visible building material, monotonous architecture, large-scale buildings and poor outdoor environment are mentioned as typical features that made the areas unattractive. Those who could afford it gradually left the districts, leaving people with weak financial resources, often with an immigrant background or in social exclusion. Today gang crime is fairly common in these more marginalized areas.

Photos

Districts

Million Programme districts include:
 Rinkeby, Tensta and Husby in Stockholm Municipality
 Bredäng, Skärholmen and Vårberg in Stockholm Municipality
 Bagarmossen in Skarpnäck in Stockholm Municipality 
 Bollmora in Tyresö (Stockholm). 
 Fisksätra in Nacka (Stockholm).
 Vårby gård, Masmo, Alby, Fittja and Hallunda in Huddinge Municipality  and Botkyrka Municipality outside Stockholm
 Jordbro and Brandbergen in Haninge Municipality outside Stockholm
 Hallonbergen in Sundbyberg Municipality
 Hagalund in Solna Municipality
 Malmvägen in Sollentuna Municipality
 Hovsjö, Geneta and Fornhöjden in Södertälje Municipality
 Hjällbo, Hammarkullen and several others in Angered in Gothenburg Municipality
 Bergsjön in Gothenburg Municipality
 Hisings-Backa and Kärra in Gothenburg
 Rosengård, Hermodsdal, Kroksbäck, Bellevuegården, Lorensborg, Lindängen, Höja, Lindeborg and Holma in Malmö
 Komarken in Kungälv
 Kronogården in Trollhättan
 Kronoparken in Karlstad
 Ryd, Johannelund, Ekholmen, Berga, and Skäggetorp in Linköping
 Gottsunda, Flogsta and Eriksberg in Uppsala
 Hertsön in Luleå
 Araby in Växjö
 Ålidhem and Mariehem in Umeå
 Årby in Eskilstuna
 Hässleholmen and Norrby in Borås
 Råslätt in Jönköping
 Ryd, Skövde in Skövde
 Hageby and Navestad in Norrköping
 Ekön in Motala
 Norrliden in Kalmar
 Linero, Norra Fäladen and Klostergården in Lund
 Korsbacka in Kävlinge
 Skogslyckan and Dalaberg in Uddevalla
 Rosta in Örebro
 Andersberg and Sätra in Gävle
 Körfältet in Östersund
 Kungshall in Nybro
 Drottninghög, Fredriksdal and Dalhem in Helsingborg
 Nacksta in Sundsvall

See also
Urbanism
Plattenbau (Germany)
Panelház (Hungary)
Panelák and Sídlisko (Czech Republic and Slovakia)
Khrushchyovka (Former Soviet Union)
Housing estate
Public housing
Subsidized housing
Subsidized housing in the United States
Section 8 (USA)
Affordable housing
Social welfare
Welfare state
Tower block
Vulnerable area

Notes

References

Political history of Sweden
Housing in Sweden
Welfare in Sweden
Modernism
Public housing
1960s in Sweden
1970s in Sweden
Projects established in 1965